Ian Stevens is a former professional rugby league footballer who played in the 1990s. He played at representative level  for Wales, and at club level for Hull FC

International honours
Ian Stevens won caps for Wales while at Hull FC 1992 2-caps + 1-cap (interchange/substitute).

References

Hull F.C. players
Living people
Place of birth missing (living people)
Wales national rugby league team players
Year of birth missing (living people)